Bucculatrix pectinifera is a moth in the family Bucculatricidae. It is found in the Jewish Autonomous Oblast of Russia. The species was described in 2007 by Svetlana Vladimirovna Baryshnikova.

References

Bucculatricidae
Moths described in 2007
Moths of Asia